RMS Amazon was a wooden three-masted barque, paddle steamer and Royal Mail Ship. She was the first of 5 sister ships  commissioned by the Royal Mail Steam Packet Company to serve RMSP's routes between Southampton and the Caribbean.

Building
By 1851 iron-hulled screw ships were increasingly common, but RMSP conservatively continued to buy new paddle steamers. The Admiralty supervised those UK merchant ships contracted to carry mail, and insisted that they all have wooden hulls. Therefore, RMSP ordered that Amazon and her four sisters be wooden-hulled paddle steamers.

R & H Green built Amazon at Blackwall Yard, London. Her keel was laid on 1 September 1850 at and she was launched on 28 June 1851. Seaward and Capel of Limehouse built her engines. They were a pair of side-lever steam engines, developing 800 hp at 14 revolutions per minute.

Maiden voyage and loss
Amazon was the first of the five sister ships to enter service. In December 1851 she reached Southampton to prepare for her maiden voyage. She carried 1,000 tons of coal for her bunkers and loaded several hundred tons of cargo. Her strong room contained 500 bottles of mercury for use in the production of mining explosive in Mexico and £20,000-worth of specie. The mercury was worth over £5,000 and the total value of the cargo was estimated at about £100,000. In common with many ships undertaking trans-oceanic voyages in that era, the ship carried livestock on deck and bales of hay to feed them.

On Friday, 2 January, Amazon, commanded by Captain William Symons, loaded mail, embarked 50 passengers and late that day she sailed for the Caribbean. In the next 24 hours she twice hove to as her engine bearings overheated. She entered the Bay of Biscay and at about 12:40 on Sunday, 4 January, smoke was sighted rising from a hatch ahead of her forward funnel. Captain Symons and his chief officer, Roberts, were quickly on deck and organised crewmen with buckets and a hose to fight the fire. Men started to move hay away from the fire, but after they had moved only two bales all the remainder caught alight.

Symons ordered that the engines be stopped and boats launched. The mail boat was lowered containing 25 people. In a heavy sea and with the ship still under way the boat was swamped and all of its occupants drowned. The fire was now such that the engine room could not be reached and so the engines could not be stopped. Symons turned the ship so that the wind was at her stern. This helped to slow the spread of fire toward her stern, but also maximised her speed and thus the difficulty in launching her boats.

The pinnace was lowered. Before its occupants could unfasten its forward tackle the heavy sea swung it around and tossed its occupants in the water. A second cutter was lowered but swamped by a wave that washed away all but two of its occupants. The starboard lifeboat was successfully launched and 16 people got away in it. The dinghy was successfully launched carrying five people.

The fire spread out of control. The starboard lifeboat rescued the five occupants of the dinghy and tried to approach the ship to rescue more people, but came in danger of being swamped and so abandoned the attempt. Amazon was still under way, rolling in the heavy sea while Symons and his crew still tried to keep her course steady.

By 04:00 the fire brought down the ship's foremast and mainmast. At 05:00 her magazine exploded and her mizzen mast was brought down as the deck  collapsed .

At 10:30 the brig Marsden, bound from London to North Carolina, rescued the 21 survivors in the starboard lifeboat and landed them at Plymouth. At first these were feared to be the only survivors. However, the Dutch galliot Gertruida rescued seven passengers, 17 crew members and a foreman from Seaward and Capel and landed them at Brest on 5 January. A second Dutch ship, Hellechina, rescued 13 survivors and transferred them to the HM Revenue cutter Royal Charlotte, which landed them at Plymouth on 16 January. The steamship  also rescued some passengers and crew.

At the beginning of February a section of Amazons timbers, partly charred by the fire, drifted ashore at Falmouth.

Deaths and aftermath
Reports of the total number of dead vary from 105 to 115. They included the popular travel writer and novelist Elliot Warburton, and the French novelist Gabriel Ferry. A national appeal, championed by Queen Victoria and Prince Albert, raised money for widows, orphans and survivors.

An enquiry into the ship's loss failed to establish a cause of the fire. The repeated overheating of the engine bearings has been cited as suggesting that the fire may have started in the engine room. However, such overheating might also be expected to cause the engines to seize, whereas they continued to run as the fire spread.

Whatever the cause, the fire caused the Admiralty to reconsider its insistence on wooden hulls for mail ships. The next ship that RMSP ordered, was built with an iron hull.

References

Sources

External links
 
 

 

1851 ships
Ships built by the Blackwall Yard
Maritime incidents in January 1852
Ship fires
Shipwrecks in the Atlantic Ocean
Steamships of the United Kingdom